IWFL may refer to: 

Independent Women's Football League
Irish Women's Franchise League